Stan Thorseth (born December 26, 1951 in Saskatoon, Saskatchewan) is a former Canadian handball player who competed in the 1976 Summer Olympics.

He was part of the Canadian handball team which finished eleventh in the 1976 Olympic tournament. He played one match.

References
 profile

1951 births
Living people
Canadian male handball players
Olympic handball players of Canada
Handball players at the 1976 Summer Olympics
Sportspeople from Saskatoon
Canadian people of Norwegian descent